Rai Futura was an Italian entertainment TV channel owned by RAI and launched May 30, 2005 on timeshares with Rai Doc.

Scheduling
Its programmes were dedicated to cinema, music, video games, comic books and television, politics, and books.

 L33T
 Larsen
 Tàbu Show
 Look at You
 Taglia e Cuci

Personalities
From May 30, 2005, to December 26, 2006:

 Daniela Arpino
 Mario Bellina
 Michele Bertocchi
 Livio Beshir
 Luana Bisconti
 Matteo Bisi
 Giulia Blasi
 Giuseppe Carlotti
 Alessandro De Angelis
 Paola Farina
 Adriana Fonzi Cruciani
 Pietro Franzetti
 Enrico Fusai
 Chiara Giallonardo
 Maria Iodice
 Lodovica Mairé Rogati
 Barbara Matera
 Andrea Materia
 Cesare Rascel
 Costanza Melani
 Chiara Michelini
 Federica Peluffo
 Edoardo Pesce
 Francesca Romana Ronchi
 Denise Santoro
 Maria Novella Tei
 Roberta Paris
 Andrea D'Agostini

Closing
Rai Future was closed on June 1, 2007 with Rai Doc, due to decision of RAI, and replaced by Rai Gulp on the same frequencies.

Futura
Television channels and stations established in 2005
Television channels and stations disestablished in 2007
Italian-language television stations